Megachile soledadensis is a species of bee in the family Megachilidae. It was described by Theodore Dru Alison Cockerell in 1900.

References

Soledadensis
Insects described in 1900